Abagrotis discoidalis is a moth of the family Noctuidae first described by Augustus Radcliffe Grote in 1876. It is found North America in Washington, Oregon and California, west to northern Arizona and New Mexico, Colorado and north into southern Alberta.

The wingspan is about 31 mm. Adults are on wing from June to August in Alberta. There is one generation per year.

References

discoidalis
Moths of North America
Moths described in 1876